Kaimosi is a town in western Kenya, heavily influenced by Quakers. It is rich in Agricultural Activities mostly Tea Farming and Production of African Leafy Vegetables and a Complex of learning Institutions like Kaimosi Friends University, Kaimosi Teachers Training College,kaimosi Theology, Friends College Kaimosi TVET Institute High Schools and Primary schools.

It is located along the C39 road, 15.7 kilometres east of Chavakali and 30 kilometres west of Kapsabet.

Writer Memba Ibrahim was born and raised in Kaimosi.

See also 
Kaimosi Friends Primary School

References 

Populated places in Western Province (Kenya)